Namata is a village in the municipal unit of Platykampos, Larissa regional unit, Greece. In 2011 its population was 105. Namata is located about 20 km east of Larissa, in the Thessalian plains.

Population

History

Namata was liberated by the Greeks in 1880 and joined the rest of the country in 1881 ending the Ottoman rule of much of Thessaly.  The origin of the name comes from the Ancient Greek word nama (νάμα) which means clean water.

External links
 Namata on GTP Travel Pages

References
This article is partly translated from an article at the Greek Wikipedia (Main page)

Populated places in Larissa (regional unit)